Barbara Concina Imperial (born August 1, 1998) is a Filipino actress and model from Daraga, Albay. She is best known for her lead role in Araw Gabi.

Career
In 2015, Imperial joined the Pinoy Big Brother: 737 and was dubbed as "The Doll along the Riles of Albay" due to her dollface.

2015–2018: Breakthrough
She also played multiple guest roles in Maalaala Mo Kaya playing the various roles of Hannah, Glaiza, and herself. She played her own story in Maalaala Mo Kaya.

Later, she appeared as a Girltrends member and is one of the regular guests in It's Showtime.

Later in February 2018, she was cast as an antagonist in Wansapanataym: Gelli in a Bottle. opposite to Loisa Andalio and Ronnie Alonte. Imperial portrayed the main villain role of Rachel San Pedro in that series. Rachel is the heartless and cunning classmate who makes Gelli's life miserable as hell. She hates her due to Gelli's arrogant and harsh personality.

2018–present: Biggest break

In 2018, Imperial got her biggest break where she currently portrays the role of Michelle Verano the lead character along with her leading man JM de Guzman.

Personal life
Imperial grew up in a broken family, not seeing her father. She, her mother and older brother used to stay in a house along the railway tracks of the Philippine National Railway in Daraga, Albay.

Imperial is a cousin of the Gumabao siblings (Michele, Marco, Kat and Paolo) and Gretchen Fullido.

Filmography

Television/Digital

Film

Music videos

References

External links
 

1998 births
Living people
Bicolano people
Filipino television actresses
People from Albay
Star Magic
ABS-CBN personalities
Pinoy Big Brother contestants